Walter Eschweiler (born September 20, 1935) is a retired German football referee. He is known for having refereed one match in the 1982 FIFA World Cup in Spain where he was accidentally knocked to the floor by a Peruvian and his cards and notebook fell out of his pocket onto the ground.

References
 Biography

External links
 Profile at worldfootball.net

1935 births
German football referees
FIFA World Cup referees
Living people
1982 FIFA World Cup referees